A tyrant is a despotic ruler or person.

Tyrant may also refer to:

Music
Bands
 Tyrant (Japanese band), a black metal band in Japan
 Tyrant, an American doom metal band later known as Saint Vitus
 Tyrant, a German thrash metal band later known as Tormentor and finally as Kreator
 Tyrant Records, a Canadian record label which merged into Union Label Group

Albums
 Tyrant (Backyard Babies album), an album by Swedish rock band Backyard Babies
 Tyrant (Circle album), an album by Finnish rock band Circle
 Tyrant, an album by American band Thou

Songs
 "Tyrant" (song), a song by heavy metal band Judas Priest on the album Sad Wings of Destiny
 "Tyrants", a song by black metal band Immortal on the album Sons of Northern Darkness
 "Tyrants" (song), a song by Catfish and the Bottlemen

Other uses 
 Tyrant (American horse), winner of the 1885 Belmont Stakes
 Tyrant (British horse), winner of the 1802 Epsom Derby
 Tyrant (Marvel Comics), a comic book character for Marvel Comics
 Tyrant (Resident Evil), a monster from Resident Evil (series)
 Tyrant (Spiderbaby Grafix), a comic book series by Steve Bissette
 Tyrant (TV series), a 2014 American television series
 Tyrant (Ultra monster), a Kaiju (fictional monster)
 Tyrant flycatchers, a family of birds
 Tyrants, a partial title to the Mega Lo Mania video game as it was titled in the U.S.
 "Tyrant 22", the call sign of Army Ranger Kristoffer Domeij

See also
 Tyranny (disambiguation)
 Tyrannus (disambiguation)
 The Tyrant (disambiguation)